Playpen:
 Playpen, a piece of furniture for an infant or young toddler
 Playpen (school), an English-medium education school in Bangladesh
 Playpen (website), a darknet child pornography site

It can also refer to:
 Exercise pen, sometimes called a playpen for pets